The men’s qualifying singles event began on 23 August in New York and was completed over four days through to and including the 26 August.

Seeds

Qualifiers

Lucky losers
  Lukáš Lacko
  Rogério Dutra da Silva

Qualifying draw

First qualifier

Second qualifier

Third qualifier

Fourth qualifier

Fifth qualifier

Sixth qualifier

Seventh qualifier

Eighth qualifier

Ninth qualifier

Tenth qualifier

Eleventh qualifier

Twelfth qualifier

Thirteenth qualifier

Fourteenth qualifier

Fifteenth qualifier

Sixteenth qualifier

References

External links
 Qualifying Draw
2011 US Open – Men's draws and results at the International Tennis Federation

Men's Singles Qualifying
US Open (tennis) by year – Qualifying